Ragnar Sigurd Ulfung (born 28 February 1927) is a Norwegian operatic tenor. Described in the Grove Dictionary of Music and Musicians as "a brilliant actor with an incisive voice", he was particularly known for his portrayals of Herod (Salome) and Mime (Der Ring des Nibelungen). He is also an opera director. Amongst the productions he has directed was a complete Ring cycle for the Seattle Opera.

Ulfung was born in Oslo and studied there and in Milan before making his debut in Let's Make an Opera (Oslo, 1950). He made a successful debut at the Royal Swedish Opera in 1958 as Canio in Pagliacci and remained a member of the company until 1984. However, he also made guest appearances abroad. He made his debut at the Metropolitan Opera on 12 December 1972 as Mime in Siegfried and went on to sing 93 performances there between 1972 and 1993. In 1975 he appeared in Ingmar Bergman's celebrated film of Mozart's The Magic Flute in the role of Monostatos. He was appointed Hovsångare in 1976.

In 2015, Ulfung at age 88 sang Altoum in Turandot at Dalhalla with i.a. Nina Stemme and Lars Cleveman.

References

Sources 
Blyth Alan, "Ulfung, Ragnar (Sigurd)", in Stanley Sadie (ed.), The New Grove Dictionary of Music and Musicians, Grove 2001, Volume 26, p. 60. 
Metropolitan Opera, Performance record: Ulfung, Ragnar (Tenor), MetOpera Database (accessed 26 April 2010)
Stiftelsen Kungliga Teaterns Solister (Foundation of Royal Theatre Soloists), Biography: Ragnar Ulfung (in Swedish, accessed 26 April 2010)

External links

Interview with Ragnar Ulfung by Bruce Duffie, September 16, 1985

1927 births
Living people
Norwegian operatic tenors
Musicians from Oslo
20th-century Norwegian male opera singers